Patrice Anato (born 14 March 1976) is a French politician of La République En Marche! (LREM) who has been serving as a member of the French National Assembly since the 2017 elections, representing the department of Seine-Saint-Denis.

Political career
In parliament, Anato serves as member of the Committee on Economic Affairs and Education and the Committee on European Affairs. In addition to his committee assignments, he is part of the parliamentary friendship groups with Cuba, Ivory Coast, Mali and Nigeria. Since 2019, he has also been a member of the French delegation to the Franco-German Parliamentary Assembly.

Political positions
In July 2019, Anato voted in favor of the French ratification of the European Union’s Comprehensive Economic and Trade Agreement (CETA) with Canada.

In addition to LREM, Anato also joined the Centrist Alliance in 2018.

See also
 2017 French legislative election

References

1976 births
Living people
Deputies of the 15th National Assembly of the French Fifth Republic
La République En Marche! politicians
Black French politicians